Ole Humlum (born 21 July 1949) is a Danish professor emeritus of physical geography at the University of Oslo , Department of Geosciences and adjunct professor of physical geography at the University Centre in Svalbard. His academic focus includes glacial and periglacial geomorphology and climatology.

Education
Born near the coast in Jylland, he became interested in geology when he visited the Alps as a teenager and saw the glaciers. He studied natural science at the University of Copenhagen, earning bachelor's degrees in geology, geography, zoology and botany. In 1976, he obtained a M.Sc. in glacial geomorphology and was the same year also awarded a Prize Essay Gold Medal at the University for another study. He earned a Ph.D degree in glacial geomorphology in 1980.

Career
After having held post-doc positions 1980–1983 he became scientific director at the University of Copenhagen Arctic Station near Qeqertarsuaq where he lived for three years. He subsequently worked as assistant professor at the University of Copenhagen from 1986–1999.

He became professor at the University Centre in Svalbard in 1999. In 2003, he became full professor at the University of Oslo, Department of Geosciences. He became a member of the newly founded Norwegian Scientific Academy for Polar Research in 2008.

Climate change views
Humlum is a member of the Norwegian climate change denialist organization Climate Realists (Klimarealistene) . He is active in Norwegian and Danish climate politics, arguing that current climate change is mainly a natural phenomenon. Together with Jan-Erik Solheim and Kjel Stordahl, he published the article "Identifying natural contributions to late Holocene climate change" in Global and Planetary Change in 2011. The article argues that changes in the sun's and moon's influence on the earth may explain most of the historical and current climate change. The theory in the article was opposed by several scientists. He predicted in 2013 that the climate would most likely become colder in the coming 10–15 years. In 2013, he wrote another article in Global and Planetary Change where he concluded that carbon dioxide lagged changes in temperature since 1975.

Each year he publishes the report 'The State of the Climate' for the Global Warming Policy Foundation, his most recent report was April 2022.

Selected publications

References 

1949 births
Living people
Danish geologists
Geomorphologists
University of Copenhagen alumni
Academic staff of the University of Copenhagen
Academic staff of the University of Oslo
Academic staff of the University Centre in Svalbard
Danish expatriates in Norway